Bachia alleni is a species of lizard in the family Gymnophthalmidae. The species is endemic to the southern Caribbean.

Etymology
The specific name, alleni, is in honor of American Zoologist Glover Morrill Allen.

The specific name, cuvieri (of the synonym, Bachia cuvieri), is in honor of French naturalist Georges Cuvier.

Geographic range
B. alleni is found in Grenada, the Grenadines, and Tobago.

Reproduction
B. alleni is oviparous.

References

Further reading
Barbour T (1914). "A Contribution to the Zoögeography of the West Indies, with Especial Reference to Amphibians and Reptiles". Memoirs of the Museum of Comparative Zoölogy at Harvard College 44 (2): 205–359 + Plate. (Scolecosaurus alleni, new species, pp. 315–316 + Plate, figures 11–15).
Murphy JC, Salvi D, Santos JL, Braswell AL, Charles SP, Borzée A, Jowers MJ (2019). "The reduced limbed lizards of the genus Bachia (Reptilia, Squamata, Gymnophthalmidae); biogeography, cryptic diversity, and morphological convergence in the eastern Caribbean". Organisms Diversity & Evolution 19: 321–340. (Bachia alleni).
Schwartz A, Thomas R (1975). A Check-list of West Indian Amphibians and Reptiles. Carnegie Museum of Natural History Special Publication No. 1. Pittsburgh, Pennsylvania: Carnegie Museum of Natural History. 216 pp. (Bachia heteropus alleni, p. 109).

Bachia
Reptiles described in 1914
Taxa named by Thomas Barbour